Aydın Güven Gürkan (May 10, 1941 Elazığ-January 22, 2006 Istanbul) was a Turkish academic and politician.

Early life
He was born in Elazığ on 10 May 1941. In 1963, he graduated from the Faculty of Political Sciences in Ankara University. In 1970, he completed his doctorate studies in the University of Cologne, Germany with highest honors summa cum laude. Returned to Turkey, in addition to teaching, he served as the dean of Faculty of Journalism in Gazi University. In 1981, he resigned from his post protesting the Council of Higher Education.

Political career
All Turkish parties were closed in 1981 by the military rule so called by the National Security Council (MGK). In 1983, the MGK decided to allow the formation of new parties with severe restrictions. Aydın Güven Gürkan joined People's Party (HP)) a new party on the track of Republican People's Party (which is usually credited as the founder of Turkish Republic in 1923. In the first elections following the military rule, Aydın Güven Gürkan was elected as the deputy from Antalya Province.

Opposition leader
On 1 July 1985, he was elected as the chairman of the party. His party was the main opposition party in the parliament. But by 1985, two other parties on the track of CHP were more popular than HP. He decided to fuse HP with the other parties with similar ideology. Although Bülent Ecevit, the leader of DSP was reluctant, Gürkan and Erdal İnönü, the chairman of SODEP agreed on a merge plan. On 3 November 1985, two parties fused to form Social Democrat Populist Party electing Gürkan the chairman of the new party. But in 1986, he was replaced by Erdal İnönü.

Later years
Gürkan served one term as the vice chairman of SHP, and in 1991 he was elected as the deputy from Mersin Province (then known as İçel Province) and served as the Minister of Labour and Social Security during the DYP-SHP coalition government in the 1990s. After SHP-newly established CHP fusion in 1995 however, he became a passive member of the party, and finally resigned from CHP. Except for a brief membership in New Turkey Party in 2002, he did not participate in politics.

Illness and death
Aydın Güven Gürkan died in the morning hours of January 22, 2006 in the intensive care unit of a hospital in Istanbul, where he was delivered shortly before. He had been on treatment for stomach cancer three years long. He had undergone a stomach surgery one and half years before, and was since then on chemotherapy. He had a heart attack one month ago. Gürkan was survived by his wife Serap Aksoy, a theatre and film actress from profession, and his daughter Burcu Gürkan. She was buried in Tuzla Cemetery.

References

2006 deaths
1941 births
People from Elazığ
Populist Party (Turkey) politicians
Social Democratic Populist Party (Turkey) politicians
Republican People's Party (Turkey) politicians
Leaders of the Opposition (Turkey)
Leaders of political parties in Turkey
Ministers of Labour and Social Security of Turkey
Deputies of Antalya
Deputies of Mersin
Deputies of Izmir
Ankara University Faculty of Political Sciences alumni
University of Cologne alumni
Academic staff of Gazi University
Deaths from stomach cancer
Deaths from cancer in Turkey
Members of the 20th Parliament of Turkey
Members of the 50th government of Turkey
Turkish political party founders